Tom Sawyer & Huckleberry Finn is a 2014 American comedy-drama/adventure film directed by Jo Kastner and starring Joel Courtney as Tom Sawyer, Jake T. Austin as Huckleberry Finn, Katherine McNamara as Becky Thatcher, Noah Munck as Ben Rogers, and with Val Kilmer as Mark Twain. It is based on Mark Twain's novels The Adventures of Tom Sawyer (1876) and Adventures of Huckleberry Finn (1884). The film was released by VMI Worldwide.

Plot summary
The adventure unfolds as Tom Sawyer and Huck Finn – Tom's friend from the streets – witness a murder in the graveyard. Tom and Huck flee to Jackson's Island and make a pact never to tell anyone about the incident. However, when the good-natured Muff Potter, who has been blamed for the murder, is sentenced to death by hanging, Tom attempts to break Muff out of jail, but it does not go as planned and Muff returns to jail. So Tom breaks his promise and returns to exonerate Muff Potter. Injun Joe, the actual murderer, makes a hasty exit from the courtroom during the trial. A short time later, Tom and Huck find references to a treasure and have to face Injun Joe again.

Cast
 Joel Courtney as Thomas Sawyer
 Jake T. Austin as Huckleberry Finn 
 Katherine McNamara as Becky Thatcher 
 Val Kilmer as Mark Twain 
 Noah Munck as Ben Rogers 
 Christine Kaufmann as Aunt Polly 
 Kaloian Vodenicharov as Injun Joe 
 Miles Mussenden as Jim
 Dan van Husen as Windy
 Sonja Kirchberger as Widow Douglas

Production
Tom Sawyer was filmed in Bulgaria in August 2011.

Home media release
The film had a limited theatrical release followed by a DVD / Video on Demand release on 7 April 2015.

See also
 List of American films of 2014

References

External links

2010s adventure comedy-drama films
2014 films
American adventure comedy-drama films
Articles containing video clips
Fictional duos
Films about orphans
Films based on American novels
Films based on The Adventures of Tom Sawyer
Films set in Missouri
Films set in the 1840s
2010s English-language films
2010s American films